Alexandra Leigh LaForce (born December 11, 1988) is an American journalist, model, and beauty pageant titleholder. She is a reporter for Turner Sports, covering the NBA on TNT. She was previously the lead reporter for SEC college football games, a courtside reporter for college basketball games, and the host of We Need to Talk on the CBS Sports Network. LaForce also worked as a broadcast sports anchor and reporter for the Cleveland, Ohio, FOX affiliate WJW. She won a 2011 Emmy award for anchoring FOX 8's Friday Night Touchdown high school football show. She was Miss Teen USA in 2005, and played college basketball at Ohio University.

Early life and education
LaForce is from Vermilion, Ohio. She attended Ohio University and played five games her freshman year under head coach Semeka Randall as a guard on the Bobcats' women's basketball team.

Career

Pageantry
LaForce began her career in pageantry after winning the Miss Ohio Teen USA 2005 title in September 2004, in her first attempt at the title. She went on to represent Ohio in the Miss Teen USA 2005 pageant held in Baton Rouge, Louisiana, on August 8, 2005. LaForce competed in the evening gown, swimsuit and final interview competitions, and was crowned Miss Teen USA 2005 by her predecessor Shelley Hennig, Miss Teen USA 2004 from Louisiana. Her mother Lesa LaForce (née Rummell) was Miss Ohio USA 1977.

Her winnings included a one-year modeling contract with Trump Modeling Management and a scholarship to the School for Film and Television in New York City. She also earned a guest appearance in the NBC soap opera Passions. LaForce made appearances throughout the United States, promoting causes such as drug and alcohol awareness, as well as continuing to attend high school in Ohio.

Sportscasting

LaForce worked as a sideline reporter for Sportstime Ohio during the 2010 Mid-American Conference's football season, the 2011 MAC men's basketball tournament, and the 2011 OHSAA basketball championships. After college, she signed with Cleveland's Fox affiliate, WJW channel 8, as a sports anchor and reporter.

In April 2014, it was announced that LaForce would replace Tracy Wolfson as the sideline reporter for the SEC on CBS.

LaForce worked as a sideline reporter for NBA TV during the NBA Summer League in Las Vegas.

In June 2018, it was reported that LaForce would be leaving CBS Sports after the two sides could not come to terms on a new deal. LaForce still makes occasional appearances on CBS, due to her March Madness reporting role.

LaForce later signed a deal with Turner Sports to continue her role as a sideline reporter for the NBA on TNT and the NCAA Tournament. In 2022, LaForce works as a field-level reporter for MLB on TBS Tuesday Night.

Personal life
LaForce is married to MLB relief pitcher Joe Smith.

References

External links

 
 Allie LaForce's Ohio Women's Basketball Profile
 Allie LaForce Walks Red Carpet at Miss USA 2014

Living people
1988 births
American beauty pageant winners
American sports journalists
Beauty pageant contestants from Ohio
College basketball announcers in the United States
College football announcers
2005 beauty pageant contestants
21st-century Miss Teen USA delegates
Miss Teen USA winners
National Football League announcers
Ohio Bobcats women's basketball players
People from Vermilion, Ohio
National Basketball Association broadcasters
High school basketball announcers in the United States
Baseball players' wives and girlfriends